Thomas Boteler may refer to:

Sir Thomas Boteler Church of England High School
Thomas Boteler (MP)